The monastery of Santa María de Nogales (Spanish: Monasterio de Santa María de Nogales) was a Cistercian monastery in Spain.

Its ruins still exist in the environs of San Esteban de Nogales.

Several important figures are buried there, including Sancha Ponce de Cabrera, Pedro Ponce de Cabrera and his wife Aldonza Alfonso de León.

Sources

Monasteries in Castile and León
Cistercian monasteries in Spain